Mađere is a village in the municipality of Ražanj, Serbia. According to the 2002 census, the village has a population of 525 people.

Demographics
In the village Mađere live 438 adult inhabitants, and the average age is 47.0 years (45.4 for men and 48.7 for women). The village has 167 households, and the average number of members per household is 3.14.
This village is largely populated by Serbs (according to the census of 2002 ) and in the last three censuses, noticed a decline in population.

References

Populated places in Nišava District